Lardoglyphus zacheri is a species of mite first discovered by Friedrich Zacher in a dermestid beetle culture. The genus Lardoglyphus was erected by Anthonie Cornelis Oudemans in 1927. The species is known to be a pest to institutional and private dermestid beetle colonies.

Lardoglyphus zacheri has been less studied than its congener L. konoi, which is occasionally called the "fish mite" and has been known to threaten supplies of cured fish. As a food supply threat the latter species is therefore more of a concern. However, much can be inferred about L. zacheri by studying L. konoi, the latter of which is known to thrive in humid environments. Thus Lardoglyphus species can be expected to become pests in many tropical and subtropical situations, especially where ambient conditions are humid. Some researchers have asserted that devastating L. zacheri infestations can occur in any climate when their target is a dermestid beetle colony. The high humidity levels produced in the often enclosed colonies are the likely cause of such infestations, even when said colonies are located in relatively dry climates.

Scientists believe that cured fish infestations of L. zacheri are initiated by dermestid (carrion) beetles that carry hypopi to the fish source in the first place. For this reason, researchers interested in studying L. zacheri concomitantly study the Dermestes maculatus carrion beetle.

References 

Sarcoptiformes
Animals described in 1927
Taxa named by Anthonie Cornelis Oudemans